The 2022 Judo Grand Prix Almada was held in Almada, Portugal, from 28 to 30 January 2022.

Event videos
The event will air freely on the IJF YouTube channel.

Medal summary

Medal table

Men's events

Women's events

Prize money
The sums written are per medalist, bringing the total prizes awarded to €98,000. (retrieved from:)

References

External links
 

2022 IJF World Tour
2022 Judo Grand Prix
Judo
Grand Prix 2022
Sport in Almada
Judo
Judo